Let It Rain is the sixth album by American singer-songwriter Tracy Chapman, released in 2002 (see 2002 in music).

Track listing
All songs written by Tracy Chapman.

Cover version 
 "Get up, Stand up" (on this release written without the comma) is a The Wailers cover. The song was originally released on the album Burnin' in 1973.

Trivia 
 All songs of the bonus live CD were recorded at the Tränenpalast, Berlin on December the 2nd, 2002.

Personnel
Tracy Chapman – acoustic guitar, bass guitar, clarinet, electric guitar, lead vocals, handclapping, electric banjo
Bill Bennet – oboe
Matthew Brubeck – cello
Jeremy Cohen – violin
Linda Ghidossi de Luca – viola
Joe Gore – acoustic guitar, piano, electric guitar, keyboard, ukulele, bazouki, gourd, lap steel guitar
Steve Hunter – electric guitar
Carla Kihlstedt – violin
Greg Leisz – dobro, pedal steel, electric guitar, lap steel guitar, mando-guitar, baritone guitar
John Parish – acoustic guitar, bass guitar, percussion, background vocals
Andy Stoller – bass guitar
Larry Taylor – upright bass
Jeanie Tracy – background vocals
Joey Waronker – percussion, drums, tambourine, handclapping, cajon, shaker
Patrick Warren – organ, piano, accordion, keyboard, bells, tack piano

Production
Producers: Tracy Chapman, John Parish
Engineer: Paul DuGre
Mixing: Paul DuGre
Mastering: John Cuniberti
Photography: Jay Blakesberg
Cover photo: Jim Herrington

Charts

Weekly charts

Year-end charts

Certifications

References

External links
 

Tracy Chapman albums
2002 albums
Elektra Records albums
Albums produced by John Parish